AlbertMing (formerly Naked Suits) is a clothing company based in Berkeley, California.

History 
AlbertMing was founded by Albert Shyy and Ming Chang, a former Apple engineer, in 2010. Both of them are UC Berkeley graduates.  Albert Shyy and Ming Chang have degrees in Business and Computer Science, respectively. The company was initially named "Naked Suits." This however was changed to "AlbertMing" in 2011 due to trademark reasons.

Product 
Naked Suits by AlbertMing or simply Naked Suits are the company's main products. The suits are waterproof, made from an undisclosed material.

Promotion 
Naked Suits is promoted by numerous artists including Public Enemy rapper Chuck D and Tim Urban.

References

External links
Official Website
Teezip Website

Clothing companies of the United States
Companies based in Berkeley, California